Benjamin Nathan (December 20, 1813 – July 28, 1870) was an American investor and philanthropist. He was bludgeoned to death in his home in 1870, and the notorious murder case remains unsolved despite several trials in the years following his death.

Biography
He was elected a member of the New York Stock Exchange in 1836, and became its vice-president in 1851. He served as a director of the Chicago and Northwestern Railroad and the Ninth Avenue Street Railway. He also served on the first Board of Directors for Jews' Hospital. He was also President of Shearith Israel.

In 1849, he was promoted to colonel and named aide-de-camp to New York State Governor Hamilton Fish. Supreme Court Judge Benjamin Nathan Cardozo, his nephew, was born the year Nathan died and was named after him. Nathan's wife Emily G. Nathan died in 1879. They had seven children, including Frederick Nathan and Washington Nathan.

He was murdered on July 28, 1870, in Manhattan, New York City. Aaron B. Rollins was the coroner who investigated the death.

Legacy
Studies in Murder, a 1924 true crime book of essays by Edmund Pearson, is about the murder.

See also
 List of unsolved murders

References

External links

1813 births
1870 deaths
Businesspeople from New York City
American people of Portuguese-Jewish descent
19th-century Sephardi Jews
American Sephardic Jews
American stockbrokers
New York Stock Exchange people
Murdered American Jews
Unsolved murders in the United States
Deaths by beating in the United States
People murdered in New York City
Male murder victims
Burials at Beth Olom Cemetery
19th-century American businesspeople